Abol is a given name. Notable people with the name include:

Abol Fath Khan (1755–1787), the third Shah of Zand dynasty, who ruled the Persian Empire for a period in 1779
Abol Hassan Ispahani (1902–1981), Pakistani legislator and diplomat
Abol-Ghasem Kashani (born 1882), prominent Twelver Shi'a Muslim cleric and former Parliament Speaker of Iran
Khaled Abol Naga (born 1966), Egyptian actor, TV host, producer and director

See also
Abol Tabol, collection of Bengali children's poems and rhymes composed by Sukumar Ray, first published in 1923
 Abol, IAU condoned proper name of exoplanet HD 16175 b, orbiting Buna (HD 16175), in the constellation of Andromeda